Lekno may refer to the following places in Poland:
Łękno, a district of the city of Szczecin, north-west Poland.
Łekno, Pomeranian Voivodeship
Łekno, Greater Poland Voivodeship
Łękno, Greater Poland Voivodeship
Łękno, Koszalin County in West Pomeranian Voivodeship

See also